CD-Action is a Polish magazine devoted to video games. Its first issue was published on April 1, 1996. In 2005, an unsuccessful attempt was made to introduce the magazine to the Czech market; only one issue was ever published.

References

1996 establishments in Poland
Magazines established in 1996
Magazines published in Warsaw
Polish-language magazines
Video game magazines published in Poland